Thomas Henry Codd (1890–1961) was an English professional footballer who played in the Football League for Leicester Fosse as an outside left.

Personal life 
9 months after the outbreak of the First World War, Codd enlisted in the Football Battalion of the Middlesex Regiment in May 1915. In June 1916, Codd was hit by shrapnel in the left eye at Vimy Ridge and, suffering from severe shell shock, was carried two miles back to safety under heavy fire by fellow footballer Arthur Mounteney. Codd lost the eye and later served in the Army Service Corps before his discharge from the army in June 1918.

Career statistics

References

1890 births
1961 deaths
Footballers from Grimsby
Association football outside forwards
English footballers
Goole Town F.C. players
Leicester City F.C. players
Harrogate Town A.F.C. players
English Football League players
Midland Football League players
British Army personnel of World War I
Middlesex Regiment soldiers
Association football midfielders
Royal Army Service Corps soldiers
English amputees
Association footballers with limb difference
English disabled sportspeople